Sanja Nanja (born February 3, 1968) is a Ghanaian politician and member of the Eight Parliament of the Fourth Republic of Ghana representing the Atebubu Amantin Constituency in the Bono East Region on the ticket of the National Democratic Congress.

Personal life 
Nanja is a Christian (Assemblies of God). He is married (with five children).

Early life and education 
Nanja was born on February 3, 1968. He hails from Saboba, a town in the Northern Region of Ghana. He entered University of Ghana and obtained his Bachelor of Arts in Sociology and History in 2005.

Politics 
Nanja is a member of the National Democratic Congress (NDC). In 2012, he contested for the Atebubu Amantin seat on the ticket of the NDC sixth parliament of the fourth republic and won. He was elected with 16,964 votes out of the 34,411 total valid votes cast, equivalent to 49.30%. Nanja could not maintain his position as Member of Parliament for  Attebubu Amantin during the 2016 elections due to a ban placed on him by members of the traditional council of his constituency. The ban was as a result of his conduct of insulting the queen mother of his constituency on radio.

Committees 
Nanja is a member of the Judiciary Committee and also a member of the Lands and Forestry Committee.

Employment 
 Ghana Education Service (teacher, Atebubu shs), Assistant Director 11
 District Chief Executive (DCE), (Atebubu District) May 7, 2009 - January 7, 2013
 Educationist

References 

Ghanaian MPs 2013–2017
1968 births
Living people
University of Ghana alumni
National Democratic Congress (Ghana) politicians
Ghanaian MPs 2021–2025